Julio Vial (1 July 1933 – 10 March 2016) was a Chilean footballer. He competed in the men's tournament at the 1952 Summer Olympics.

References

External links
 
 

1933 births
2016 deaths
Chilean footballers
Chile international footballers
Olympic footballers of Chile
Footballers at the 1952 Summer Olympics
Place of birth missing
Association football defenders
Colo-Colo footballers